Neighbours in a Thicket : Poems (1974) is the second poetry collection by Australian poet and author David Malouf. It won the ALS Gold Medal, the Grace Leven Prize for Poetry, and the Colin Roderick Award, all in 1974.

The collection consists of 34 poems, all of which are published for the first time in this volume.

Contents

Critical reception
Geoffrey Page in The Canberra Times noted the one thing all reviewers of the book "seem agreed on is the sophistication and depth of Malouf's poems about Europe. There is no other Australian poet who has such a feeling for its history, its essential character, its actual soil." But this was not to diminish "its distinct Australian quality. Although the section of European poems in the middle of the book seems to be its core the majority of the poems are in fact located in Australia - and are in no way inferior. Malouf's Australia is a place where the legendary, the extravagant are inextricably linked to hard reality. Beneath the service stations is the mythical swamp of his childhood: not far beyond our everyday Australia is the Great South Land which fired the European imagination for centuries (and in which Malouf can still see the magic)."

Awards
 1974 – Grace Leven Prize for Poetry winner
 1974 – Townsville Foundation for Australian Literary Studies Award winner
 1974 – ALS Gold Medal winner
 1974 – Colin Roderick Award winner

See also
 1974 in Australian literature
 1974 in poetry

References

Australian poetry collections
1974 poetry books